New Egypt Speedway is a 7/16 mile clay race track in New Egypt, New Jersey. The track hosted the NASCAR Whelen Modified Tour on a quarter mile asphalt track in the 1980s.

History
The track was built in 1946 as a 1/4 mile dirt track, before being converted to a paved race track during the 1960s, through the early 1990s when the track was abandoned.

The speedway was about to be torn down until the Grosso family purchased it in 1997. Until this point the speedway had steadily deteriorated from bad to worse. Originally pavement, the new NES brought dirt track racing back to Ocean County, New Jersey. With a complete track makeover, motorsports promoters from all 50 states named the speedway "Most Outstanding Rehabilitation of a Speedway," putting the central New Jersey track in the national spotlight during Daytona Speedweeks. The Grossos leveled the existing facility and replaced it with a 1/3-mile dirt track.

In 2006, New Egypt Speedway was purchased by Bill Miscoski and Fred Vahlsing. Under Miscoski and Vahlsing’s guidance, in 2009, the Speedway was widened to the current configuration 7/16-mile D-shaped clay oval.

In July 2022, The speedway went under new management.

Events
New Egypt Speedway currently holds races on Saturday nights from April to October. The speedway draws over 60 race cars on a weekly basis. Additionally, it occasionally hosts weekly high-profile specials. Along with World of Outlaw Sprint cars, It has hosted World of Outlaws late model races in the past.

The NASCAR Whelen Modified Tour had 6 events at the speedway, between 1985 and 1986 in the former 1/4 mile paved track.

Notable drivers
New Egypt has been home to many drivers over the years, including Martin Truex Jr., Ray Evernham, Kenny Brightbill, Stewart Friesen, and local legend Billy Pauch.

References

External links
Official website
NJ Racing Nostalgia/History

Motorsport venues in New Jersey
Buildings and structures in Ocean County, New Jersey
Tourist attractions in Ocean County, New Jersey
Plumsted Township, New Jersey
NASCAR tracks